Piyaphon Phanichakul (born November 8, 1987), born Piyaphon Buntao, simply known as Dai, is a Thai professional footballer who plays as a right back for Thai League 1 club  Nongbua Pitchaya.

International career

Piyaphon was called up to the national team, in coach Winfried Schäfer first squad selection for the  2014 FIFA World Cup qualification. He was a starter playing as a right back in the 2012 AFF Suzuki Cup.

In 2014, he was called up to the national team by Kiatisuk Senamuang to play in the 2015 AFC Asian Cup qualification.

International

Honours

Club
Muangthong United
 Thai League 1: 2010, 2012
 Thai League 1: 2015–16
 Kor Royal Cup: 2010

Chiangrai United
 Thai League 1: 2019
 Thai FA Cup: 2017, 2018
 Thai League Cup: 2018
 Thailand Champions Cup: 2018, 2020

Buriram United
 Thai League 1: 2021–22
 Thai FA Cup: 2021–22
 Thai League Cup: 2021–22

References

External links

1987 births
Living people
Piyaphon Phanichakul
Piyaphon Phanichakul
Association football fullbacks
Piyaphon Phanichakul
Piyaphon Phanichakul
Piyaphon Phanichakul
Piyaphon Phanichakul
Piyaphon Phanichakul
Piyaphon Phanichakul
Piyaphon Phanichakul
Piyaphon Phanichakul